Coton is a hamlet in county of Northamptonshire, England. It is located between Guilsborough and Ravensthorpe. Coton is in the civil parish of the latter, which in turn is part of West Northamptonshire. Coton Manor is a popular visitor attraction for its gardens and bluebell woods.

The hamlet’s name means 'At the cottages'.

References

External links 

 Coton Manor

Hamlets in Northamptonshire
West Northamptonshire District